Abid Hussain Thangal is an Indian politician, who has been MLA of Kottakkal, Kerala since 2016.

2021 Kerala State Assembly election 
Thangal defeated N.A Muhammed Kutty (Mammuty) from Nationalist Congress Party in 2021 assembly elections in Kottakkal (State Assembly) constituency. He secured a vote share of 51.08% and a winning margin of 16,588 votes.

References

1960 births
Living people
Indian Union Muslim League politicians
Kerala MLAs 2016–2021
Kerala MLAs 2021–2026
Place of birth missing (living people)